Anja Kling (born 22 March 1970) is a German actress. She is the younger sister of actress Gerit Kling.

Selected filmography 
  (1989)
 Landschaft mit Dornen (1992, TV film)
  (1994, TV series)
  (1995)
  (1995, TV miniseries)
 From Hell to Hell (1997)
 La piovra (1997–1998, TV series)
  (1999, TV film)
  (1999, TV film)
 September (2003)
 Das fliegende Klassenzimmer (2003, TV Film)
 Traumschiff Surprise – Periode 1 (2004)
  (2005)
 Where Is Fred? (2006)
 Lilly the Witch: The Dragon and the Magic Book (2009)
  (2009)
  (2010, TV film)
  (2010, TV film)
 Lilly the Witch: The Journey to Mandolan (2011)
 Fünf Freunde (2012)
  (2013, TV miniseries)
  (2014, TV film)
  (2015, TV film)
  (2015)
 Le Wallenstein: Creature della notte (2016)
 The Same Sky (2017)
 Jenseits der Angst (2019, TV film)
 The Freud (2020, netflix series)

Audiobooks 
 2009: Sally Koslow: Ich, Molly Marx, kürzlich verstorben, publisher: der Hörverlag,

References

External links 

Margarita Kling Agency Wilhelmshorst 
Anja Kling at the German Dubbing Card Index

1970 births
Living people
German film actresses
German television actresses
German voice actresses
People from Potsdam
21st-century German actresses